The  is a river in Japan which flows through Gifu Prefecture. It empties into the Nagara River.

River communities
The river passes through the cities of Yamagata and Gifu.

References

Rivers of Gifu Prefecture
Rivers of Japan